Ida Public Schools is a public school district in Ida, Michigan, United States.  The district includes all of Ida Township and a large portion of Raisinville Township.  Being centrally located in Monroe County, Ida Public Schools also serves portions of several other townships.  The district, which serves approximately 1,600 students, consists of three schools on one main campus just off of Lewis Avenue in a sparsely populated and rural area.

Schools

Elementary schools
Ida Elementary School

Secondary schools
Ida Middle School
Ida High School

References

External links
Ida Public Schools Homepage
Superintendent Richard Carsten replaced by David Eack

School districts in Michigan
Education in Monroe County, Michigan